Ort der Vielfalt (German for 'place of diversity') is an initiative launched in 2007 by the Federal Ministry of Family Affairs, Senior Citizens, Women and Youth, the Federal Ministry of the Interior and the Federal Government Commissioner for Migration, Refugees and Integration with the aim of strengthening the commitment of communities, towns and districts in Germany to cultural diversity. This initiative comes from the federal programmes Vielfalt tut gut. Jugend für Vielfalt, Toleranz und Demokratie (German for Variety is good. Youth for diversity, tolerance and democracy) and kompetent. für Demokratie – Beratungsnetzwerke gegen Rechtsextremismus (German for competent. for democracy - advisory networks against right-wing extremism). Since 1 January 2011, the Federal Programme Toleranz fördern – Kompetenz stärken (Promoting Tolerance - Strengthening Competence) has again been continuing the two federal programmes under one roof.

The initiative is supported by the federal states, the local umbrella organisations, business, trade unions and other organisations. Committed communities, towns and districts are awarded a "Place of Diversity" sign.

List of "Ort der Vielfalt"-municipalities

Since 23 September 2008 

 Altmarkkreis Salzwedel
 Anhalt-Bitterfeld, Landkreis
 Augsburg
 Bad Bentheim
 Bad Wildungen
 Blankenfelde-Mahlow
 Bomlitz
 Bützow
 Dahme-Spreewald, Landkreis
 Darmstadt
 Demmin, Landkreis
 Eberswalde
 Erding
 Erding, Landkreis
 Forchheim, Landkreis
 Freiberg, Region
 Friedrichshain-Kreuzberg, Bezirk in Berlin
 Fürstenwalde/Spree
 Göppingen
 Goslar
 Günzburg, Landkreis
 Halberstadt
 Harz, Landkreis
 Herford
 Herzogenrath
 High Fläming Nature Park
 Kaufbeuren
 Kiel
 Kyffhäuserkreis
 Leipzig
 Lichtenberg, Bezirk in Berlin
 Limburg-Weilburg, Landkreis
 Löbau-Zittau, Region
 Lübben (Spreewald)
 Lüneburg
 Magdeburg
 Minden
 Mittweida, Region
 Muldental, Region
 Murrhardt
 Neukölln, Bezirk in Berlin
 Neumarkt in der Oberpfalz
 Neustadt in Holstein
 Nordhausen
 Oranienburg
 Pankow, Bezirk in Berlin
 Pirna
 Pößneck
 Rehlingen-Siersburg
 Rems-Murr-Kreis
 Riesa
 Rüdersdorf bei Berlin
 Saale-Holzland-Kreis
 Sächsische Schweiz, Region
 Sinsheim
 Sonneberg, Landkreis
 Tempelhof-Schöneberg, Bezirk in Berlin
 Weimar
 Wiesbaden-Biebrich
 Wolgast
 Wunsiedel
 Wuppertal

Since 25 May 2009  

 Aachen
 Bad Kreuznach
 Bad Langensalza
 Bad Nenndorf
 Bad Pyrmont
 Bamberg
 Bautzen, Landkreis
 Bernkastel-Wittlich, Landkreis
 Blankenburg (Harz)
 Böblingen
 Bremen
 Burg
 Burgenlandkreis
 Calw
 Charlottenburg-Wilmersdorf, Bezirk in Berlin
 Cham (Oberpfalz)
 Cham, Landkreis
 Chemnitz
 Coswig (Sachsen)
 Dorfen
 Dormagen
 Dortmund
 Duisburg
 Düren, Kreis
 Düsseldorf
 Eisenach
 Eisleben
 Elbe-Elster, Landkreis
 Erfurt
 Erlangen
 Eschweiler
 Falkenberg/Elster
 Falkensee
 Görlitz
 Görlitz, Landkreis
 Gröditz
 Halle (Saale)
 Hennigsdorf
 Hohenstücken, Ortsteil in Brandenburg (Havel)
 Jena
 Jülich
 Karlsruhe
 Koblenz
 Köln
 Kusel, Landkreis
 Lauchhammer
 Lauenburg/Elbe
 Lauterbach (Hessen)
 Lehrte
 Lohra
 Lübbenau/Spreewald
 Ludwigshafen am Rhein
 Ludwigslust, Landkreis
 Mansfeld-Südharz, Landkreis
 Marburg
 Marl
 Marzahn-Hellersdorf, Bezirk in Berlin
 Merzig-Wadern, Landkreis
 Miesbach
 Mölln
 Morbach
 Münster
 Nordhorn
 Nordvorpommern, Landkreis
 Osterode am Harz, Landkreis
 Ostprignitz-Ruppin, Landkreis
 Prenzlau
 Pulheim
 Rathenow
 Sulzbach-Rosenberg
 Sächsische Schweiz-Osterzgebirge, Landkreis
 Sangerhausen
 Schönebeck
 Schöneiche bei Berlin
 Schweich an der Römischen Weinstraße
 Schwerin
 Sebnitz-Kirnitzschtal
 Senftenberg
 Starnberg, Landkreis
 Straubing
 Strausberg
 Stuttgart
 Treptow-Köpenick, Bezirk in Berlin
 Trier
 Trier-Saarburg, Landkreis
 Uckermark, Landkreis
 Uecker-Randow, Landkreis
 Vlotho
 Vogtlandkreis
 Unstrut-Hainich-Kreis
 Werder (Havel)
 Wildau
 Wittmund
 Würzburg
 Zwickau

Since 10 October 2010 
 Hamburg-Mitte (borough of Hamburg)

Since 21 October 2010 

 Altona, Hamburg
 Amelinghausen (Samtgemeinde)
 Bad Doberan, Landkreis
 Bad Dürkheim
 Bad Liebenwerda
 Birkenfeld
 Braunschweig
 Celle
 Dessau-Roßlau
 Dresden
 Düren
 Eislingen/Fils
 Freital
 Fürth
 Gardelegen
 Großräschen
 Hanau
 Hermannsburg
 Hoyerswerda
 Ilm-Kreis
 Lohne (Oldenburg)
 Mainz
 Mannheim
 Märkisch-Oderland, Landkreis
 Müritz, Landkreis
 Nieder-Olm, Verbandsgemeinde
 Nienburg/Weser
 Nordwestmecklenburg, Landkreis
 Oberspreewald-Lausitz, Landkreis
 Ohrdruf
 Ostalbkreis
 Perleberg
 Quedlinburg
 Rothenburg ob der Tauber
 Saarbrücken
 Schneeberg
 Schorndorf
 Schwalm-Eder-Kreis
 Sulzbach/Saar
 Unterlüß
 Verden an der Aller
 Verden, Landkreis
 Wadern
 Weiden in der Oberpfalz
 Weilburg an der Lahn
 Wernigerode
 Wutha-Farnroda

References

Organisations based in Germany
2007 establishments in Germany
Multiculturalism in Europe